Veniamin Borisovich Smekhov (born August 10, 1940 in Moscow) is a Soviet and Russian stage and film actor and director. He was the winner of the Petropol Award (2000) as well as the Tsarskoselsky Artistic Prize (2009). He refused the title of People's Artist of Russia, which was offered to him on his 70th birthday.

Smekhov has long worked in the Moscow Taganka Theatre where his roles included Woland in a stage adaptation of Mikhail Bulgakov's The Master and Margarita. His portrayal of the main antagonist of the story is considered to be the best of any adaption of the novel. In film, he is best known and loved for the role of Athos in a Russian version of D'Artagnan and Three Musketeers (1978) and its sequels (1992, 1993). He also has written children's poetry, scripts, memoirs and comedic materials.

Family
Father: Boris Moiseyevich Smekhov (January 10, 1912, Gomel, Belarus - October 8, 2010, Aachen, Germany - professor, doctor of economics. Grandfather - Moisey Yakovlevich Smekhov - accountant.

Mother: Maria Lvovna Schwartzburg (1918-1996) - doctor, head of her department in a Moscow clinic. Grandfather - Lev Aronovich Schwartzburg, born in the town of Shpola in Kiev Province, and then moved to Odessa. He was a shoemaker.

Uncle (father's side) - famous book illustrator Lev Moiseyevich Smekhov (1908, Petrovichi - 1978). He was the father of artists Arkady Lvovich Smekhov (b. 1936) and Zinovy Lvovich Smekhov (b. 1939). Veniamin's other uncle (father's side), Yefim Moiseyevich Smekhov, was the head artist for the publication Meditsina.

Alla Aleksandrovna Smekhova, a radio editor, was Veniamin's first wife and the mother of his daughters Alika (b. 1968), an actress and singer and Elena (b. 1963), a writer. His grandchildren include Elena's son, Leonid Smekhov (b. 1987), and Alika's sons, Artem Smekhov (b. 2000) and Makar Smekhov (b. 2007).

Veniamin has been married to Galina Aksenova (Galina Gennad'evna), Candidate of Art, professor at the Moscow Art Theatre School, translator, and film and theatre scholar, since 1980.

Biography

Veniamin Smekhov spent his childhood in Moscow on Second Meshchansky Street (present day Gilyarovsky Street). He saw his father only after he returned from the war in 1945. From 1947 to 1957 he was a student at School № 235 on Pal'chikov Lane where he was a part of the Palace of Pioneers drama club. V.E. Struchkova led the club and Rolan Bykov worked with the students. In 1957 Veniamin was accepted into the B.V. Shchukin Theatre School, the conservatory of the E. Vakhtangov Theatre. He studied in the class of V.A. Etush. It was Veniamin's uncle, Lev Smekhov, who encouraged him to study at the school. In 1959 he was removed from his class and began the second year of study as an auditor. This was a probationary measure. In April of 1959 he regained his student status. His graduation performances included Moliere's Le Bourgeois Gentilhomme in which he played Covielle, and Ostrovsky's Warm Heart in which he played Narkis.

In 1961 Veniamin graduated from acting school and was sent to the Kuybiyshevsky Drama Theatre where he worked for one year. Upon his return to Moscow in 1962, director A.K. Plotnikov accepted him into the Moscow Theatre of Drama and Comedy. In 1964 Yuri Lyubimov became head director of the theatre. Lyubimov reorganized the theatre and it became the Taganka Theatre. From 1985 to 1987 Veniamin worked in the Sovremennik Theatre where he, along with Leonid Filatov and Vitaly Shapovalov, fled after Lyubimov's expulsion from the Soviet Union. Veniamin returned to the Taganka Theatre in 1987 and worked there until 1998.

Veniamin began acting in films in 1968, but he gained widespread popularity after playing the role of Athos in the famous made-for-television film D'Artagnan and Three Musketeers, filmed at the Odessa Film Studio in 1978. He played Athos in all of the followup films as well. 

In 1967 he began working as a freelance television director at Gostelradio USSR, the main producer of literary-drama programs. His first work was the teleplay Mayakovsky's Day. It was based on his own script and aired as a part of the Poetic Theatre series. In 1990 he began directing theatre performances, operas and made-for-television films in Russia and abroad, and he taught acting for several years in American universities. During this time he continued to act at the Taganka Theatre when he was in Russia.

In America Veniamin released a series of compact disks, The Library of Russian Classics, in 1998. He has made around 20 solo audio books as well as a large collection of audio book compilations.

In 2011 Veniamin returned to the Taganka Theatre as a guest actor and director. He reprised the role of Woland in Master and Margarita on two occasions that included a dedication performance in memory of actor Vsevolod Sobolev and the 50th anniversary of the Taganka Theatre. He currently performs as an actor in two poetic performances No Years (he also composed and directed this performance) and The Spine of the Flute. He lives in Moscow and very frequently tours with his performances and evenings of poetry. Veniamin also makes poetic programs and documentary films for television. He is also the author of several books of both poetry and prose, and memoirs. He has called himself an actor, director, writer and traveler. Veniamin has participated in theatrical online readings of the works of Anton Chekhov, Leo Tolstoy and Mikhail Bulgakov, including Chekhov Is Alive (September 25, 2015), War and Peace. We Read the Novel (December 8, 2015) and a Google-Reading of Master and Margarita. I Was There (November 12, 2016).

Theatre Roles
Shchukin Theatre School
1957-1961
 * Cruelty - author Nilin, (second year)
 * Man With A Gun - Chibisov, (second year)
 * Ward № 6 - Ivan Dmitrich, (third year)
 * The Minor - Adam Adamiych Vral'man
 * Warm Heart - Narkis, (fourth year)
 * Le Bourgeois Gentilhomme - Covielle, (graduation)

The "Gorky" Kuybiyshevsky Drama Theatre
1961
 * Ocean A. Stein, directed by P. Monastiyrsky - Chasovnikov
 * Be Careful of Falling Leaves S. Mikhailkov, directed by P. Monastiyrsky - Lieutenant Yura
 * Egor Buliychev M. Gorky, directed by A. Grinich - Dostigaev
 * Story Nights I. Tumanovskaya - journalist Kalitin
1962
 * Person Nearby V. Mol'ko, directed by Y. Kirzhner - Boris
 * Richard III W. Shakespeare, directed by P. Monastiyrsky - Katsby

Moscow Theatre of Drama and Comedy
1963
 * Blizzard L. Leonov, directed by A. Plotnikov - M. Nayazmetov
 * Show America S. Larionov, directed by P. Fomenko - Columbus № 2
 * The Truth Comes Home I. Kallan, directed by Y. Gubenko - Son
 * Microdistrict L. Karelin, directed by P. Fomenko - performed in an episode
 * Tale of the Soldier and the Snake T. Grabbe, directed by Petrova - Doctor

Taganka Moscow Theatre of Drama and Comedy
1964
 * The Good Person of Szechwan B. Brecht, directed by Y. Lyubimov - 3rd God
 * Hero of Our Time M. Lermontov, stage adaptation by N. Erdman and Y. Lyubimov, directed by Y. Lyubimov - Author, Officer
 * Jean the Brave T. Grabbe, directed by B. Breev - Doctor
 * Cow N. Khikmet, directed by P. Fomenko - Engaged Captain (performance taken from rehearsal)
1965
 * The Suicide Victim N. Erdman, directed by Y. Lyubimov (performance was banned)
 * Ten Days That Shook the World J. Reed, directed by Y. Lyubimov - Senator, Passerby With a Cane, Delegate of the Duma, Red Army Soldier, Soldier in the Trenches, Face of the Swamp, Minister
 * The Fallen and the Living stage adaptation by D. Samoilev, Y. Lyubimov, B. Gribanov, directed by Y. Lyubimov, Peter Fomenko - I. Erenburg, B. Slutsky
 * Anti-WorldsA. Voznesensky, directed by Y. Lyubimov
1966
 * Life of Galileo B. Brecht, directed by Y. Lyubimov - Curator Priuli, Cardinal Bellarmin
 * Alive (based on B. Mozhaev's Kuz'kin's Life - (performance was banned)
1967
 * Listen! V. Mayakovsky, stage adaptation by Y. Lyubimov and V. Smekhov, directed by Y. Lyubimov - Mayakovsky-Cynic
 * Pugachev S. Esenin - Official
1968
 * Mokinpott (How Mr. Mokinpott Escaped His Misfortunes) directed by Y. Lyubimov and M. Levitin - Lord God
 * Tartuffe J. B. Moliere, directed by Yuri Lyubimov - Kleant
1969
 * Mother M. Gorky, directed by Yuri Lyubimov - Gendarme General
 * Rush Hour E. Stavinsky, stage adaptation by V. Smekhov, directed by Y. Lyubimov - K. Maksimovich
1970
 * Watch Your Faces A. Voznesensky, directed by Y. Lyubimov (it was performed three times before it was banned)
1971
 * Hamlet W. Shakespeare, directed by Y. Lyubimov - Claudius
1972
 * Under the Skin of the Statue of Liberty E. Evtushenko, directed by Y. Lyubimov, B. Glagolin, A. Vasil'ev, V. Smekhov, L. Filatov
1973
 * Comrade, Believe! A.S. Pushkin, stage adaptation by Y. Lyubimov and L. Tselinkovsky, directed by Yuri Lyubimov
 * Benefit. Actors For A. Ostrovsky A. Ostrovsky, directed by Y. Lyubimov, B. Glagolin, A. Vil'kin, V. Smekhov
1975
 * Fasten Your Seat belts! stage adaptation by G. Baklonov and Yuri Lyubimov, directed by Yuri Lyubimov - Gera, Radio and Television Corresspondent
1977
 *Master and Margarita M. Bulgakov, directed by Y. Lyubimov, A. Vil'kin, B. Glagolin - Woland
1978
 * Cautionary Tale N. Gogol', directed by Y. Lyubimov, V. Smekhov - Plyushkin and Writer
 * Searching For a Genre adapted for the stage and directed by Y. Lyubimov
1980
 * House On the Embankment Y. Trifonov, directed by Y. Lyubimov - D. Glebov
1981
 * Vladimir Viysotsky composed and directed by Y. Lyubimov (it was performed twice and then banned)
 * Boris Godunov A.S. Pushkin, directed by Y. Lyubimov (banned before the first performance)
1985
 * The Lower Depths M. Gorky, directed by A. Efros - Baron

Sovremennik Theatre
 * Holy Bondage J.B. Moliere, directed by I. Kvashi -Ludwig the Great
 * Twin M Roshchin, directed by G. Volchek - Kirill. Premiered in October 1986.
 * Eastern Tribune A. Galin, directed by L. Kheyfets - Vadim, 1985.
 * Dilettantes (creative evening performed by the theatre's artists) Premiered on December 1, 1987.

Taganka Theatre
1988
 * Vladimir Viysotsky composed and directed by Y. Lyubimov
1990
 * The Suicide Victim N. Erdman, directed by Y. Lyubimov, B. Glagolin, V Smekhov - Aristarkh Dominikovich Goloshchapov
2013
 * No Years E. Evtushenko, directed by V. Smekhov
2015
 * Spine of the Flute V. Mayakovsky, directed by G. Aksenova

Politheatre
2012
 * Waves V. Sorokin, directed by E. Boyakov
 * Memory of Space Poetic One-Man Performance
 * Twelve Poetic Evening-Performance

Gogol' Center
 * Pasternak. My Sister - Life directed by M. Didenko

Filmography
Acting Roles
1. 1968 - Two Comrades Served - Baron Krauze
2. 1969 - The Air of Sovnarkom - Petrovsky (not credited)
3. 1971 - Twenty Years Later - Aramis
4. 1976 - Smoke and the Baby - Smoke (voiced by Vladimir Ferapontov)
5. 1977 - Middle of Life - Dennis 
6. 1979 D'Artagnan and Three Musketeers - Athos
7. 1979 I Ask to Accuse Klava K. of My Death - Uncle Seva
8. 1983 The Story of Voyages - Local Don Quixote
9. 1984 Favorites of the Moon - episode
10. 1986 Seven Cries in the Ocean - Baron Porto
11. 1988 Puppy - Alexander, journalist for Komsomol'sky Truth
12. 1990 Trap For the Single Man - Maksimen
13. 1991 Fool - Benjamin Borever
14. 1992 Key - Alexander Brown
15. 1992 Musketeers Twenty Years Later - Athos
16. 1993 The Secret of Queen Anne or Musketeers Thirty Years Later - Athos
17. 1993 Breakfast With a View on El'brus - Sumarokov
18. 2004 Middle Age, Or All Men Are bas... - Alexander, Sonia's Admirer
19. 2007 The Captain's Children - Lev Goreyno
20. 2008 Montecristo - Ilia Orlov
21. 2008 The Magician Friend Is Flying In - Semen Semenovich
22. 2009 The Return of The Musketeers, Or the Treasure of Cardinal Mazarini - Athos
23. 2009 Proposed Circumstances - Georgiy Strunin, Director
24. 2011 Furtseva - Peter Vladimirovich Boguslavsky
25. 2011 Countertrig - Baron von Libenfel's, Olaf's Uncle
26. 2012 The Toy Salesman - Ivan Polikarpovich, Professor
27. 2013 Finding a Husband In the Big City - Alexander Gordeev, Lisa's Father
28. 2014 Spiral - Yakob Arnol'dovich
29. 2014 The Frog Princess - Kashcheev
30. 2014 Bones - Vitaliy Borisovich Deykevich
31. 2016 Mafia: The Game of Survival - Luka Sergeyevich

Television Productions
1. 1965 - The Room
2. 1965 - Four Friends and the Magic Slippers
3. 1969 - Khafiz
4. 1971 - Twenty Years Later - Aramis
5. 1972 - The Magician From Shiraz - Khafiz (he was also the author of the script and director)
6. 1983 - Ali Baba and the Forty Thieves - Mustafa (he was also the author of the script and song lyrics)
7. 1983 - Monsieur Lenoir, Who... - Victor Lenoir
8. 1984 - The Life and Books of Alexander Green - Visitor, Til's, Bill, Read-Headed Young Man, Guard
9. 1984 - Ten Jazz Scenes Based on Macbeth - Macbeth
10. 2002 - Willy-Nilly Doctor - Sganarel'
11. 2016 - Disturber of the Peace - Hussein Guslia

Director 
1. 1967 - Mayakovsky's Day (television)
2. 1971 - First Songs - Last Songs (television)
3. 1972 - Magician From Shiraz (television)
4. 1973 - Frederick Moro (television)
5. 1982 - Gentlemen From Congress (television)
6. 1985 - The Sorochinsky Market (television)
7. 2002 - Willy-Nilly Doctor (television)
8. 2013 - Movie Star Between the Hammer and Sickle (documentary film about Marina Ladiynina)
9. 2013 - Vladimir Tendryakov. A Portrait In the Background of Time (documentary film)
10. 2015 - The Last Poet of the Great War (documentary film about Ion Degen)
11. 2015 - Boris Zaborov. Searching For Lost Time (documentary film about Boris Zaborov)
12. 2016 - Archives. Film 1. Alexander Dovzhenko and Yulia Solntseva
13. 2016 - Archives. Film 2. Elem Klimov and Larisa Shepit'ko

Scenarist
1. 1967 - Mayakovsky's Day (television)
2. 1971 - First Songs - Last Songs (television)
3. 1972 - Magician From Shiraz (television)
4. 1983 - Ali Baba and the Forty Thieves
5. 1985 - Sorochinsky Market (television)
6. 2013 - Movie Star Between the Hammer and Sickle (documentary film about Marina Ladiynina)
7. 2013 - Vladimir Tendryakov. A Portrait In the Background of Time (documentary film) 
8. 2014 - Volcano Theatre (documentary film)
9. 2015 - The Last Poet of the Great War (documentary film about Ion Degen) 
10. 2016 - Archives. Film 1. Alexander Dovzhenko and Yulia Solntseva
11. 2016 - Archives. Film 2. Elem Klimov and Larisa Shepit'ko

Voice Work
1. 1971 - Good! (based on B. Mayakovsky)
2. 1970 - Late Child - text from the author
3. 1973 - Mayakovsky On Love (television) - reads poetry
4. 1978 - A Lucky Person - behind the scenes text
5. 1979 - Call of the Fading Summer - behind the scenes text (not credited)
6. 1987 - Face To Face With Height (Soviet Sport №3) - speaker
7. 2003 - Bowl (documentary film about Andrei Pozdeev) - text from the author
8. 2003 - Preserve Everything That Is Dear.., Or Erdman and Stepanova: A Double Portrait In the Interior of An Era - reads for Nikolai Erdman
9. 2008 - Hostages of the Future (documentary film about David Burlyuk) - behind the scenes text
10. 2009 - A Room and a Half, Or Sentimental Travels to the Homeland (documentary film) - text from the author 
11. 2009 - Great Novgorod - Motherland of Russia (documentary film) - behind the scenes text
12. 2009 - Great Novgorod in Russia's History - behind the scenes text
13. 2011 - Participated in the voice work for the album, Blood Holiday, of the group The King and the Joker 
14. 2012 - Participated in the voice work for the album, On the Edge, of the group The King and the Joker
15. 2013 - Terezine. Code of Life - (documentary film) - behind the scenes text
16. 2013 - I Am Zal - behind the scenes text (voice of Zal)
17. 2015 - Boris Zaborov. Searching For Lost Time (documentary film) - behind the scenes text
18. 2016 - Archives. Film 1. Alexandra Dovzhenko and Yulia Sol'ntseva - behind the scenes text
19. 2016 - Archives. Film 2. Elem Klimov and Larisa Shepit'ko (documentary film)

Dubbing
1. 1974 - Agonia - King Andronnikov
2. 1976 - Pastoral
3. 1976 - Only the Wind Knows the Answer - Kessler
4. 1982 - The Chosen Ones - Dr. Fausto
5. 1983 - Paul Gauguin 
6. 1987 - Pretender - Dino Castello
7. 2017 - The Death of Stalin - Vyacheslav Molotov (dubbing was not utilized)

Animation Voice Artist
1. 1969 - Mystery - Buff (based on V. Mayakovsky)
2. 1974 - The Wizard of Oz - Bastinda
3. 1975 - What Do You Want?
4. 1979 - Adventures of Captain Wrongel - Admiral, Radio Announcer, Reporter 3 
5. 2014 - Lelya and Min'ka - text from the author
6. 2014 - See the Music - Antonio Sverchinsky

Selected Audio Books
 1998 Viy N. Gogol'
 1998 Twelve Chairs Il'f and Petrov
 1998 Master and Margarita M. Bulgakov
 1998 Russian Folk Tales A. Afanas'ev
 1998 Chosen D. Kharms
 1998 Tales From Russian Writers A. Pushkin, V. Zhukovsky, S. Aksakov
 1998 Queen of Spades A. Pushkin
 1998 Odessa Tales I. Babel'
 2004 The Suicide Victim N. Erdman
 2005 When I Was Athos. Yuri Lyubimov V. Smekhov
 2005 Shishkin's Forest A. Chervinsky
 2006 Carousel S. Marshak
 2007 Chosen V. Mayakovsky
 2007 The Fifth Mountain P. Koel'o
 2007 For Whom the Bell Tolls E. Hemingway
 2007 The Koliymsky Tales V. Shalamov
 2007 To the Comrades' Children (poems from Soviet Writers) V. Mayakovsky, Y. Vladimirov, S Cherniy, D. Kharms, V. Lebedev-Kumach
 2008 Walpurgis Night V. Erofeev
 2009 Ali Baba and the Forty Thieves V. Smekhov (reads the author)
 2009 The Three Musketeers A. Dumas
 2010 Netlenki (the plays Ali Baba and the Forty Thieves, Once Upon A Time There Were Hedgehogs, Hammers, People, Dolls and Objects, reads the author)
 2010 The Angel's Doll E. Kochergin
 2012 Lover of Death B. Akunin
 2013 Moscow - Cockerels V. Erofeev
 2015 One Fine Day V. Smekhov
 2015 Spring Flip-Flops V. Tendryakov
 2016 Collection of Essays V. Tendryakov
 2017 Galaxy of Hound Puppies and Other Tales and Stories K. Paustovsky

Author
 "The Best Activity In the World." - Journal Yunost', #9. 1970.
 "Notes From the Wings." - Journal Yunost', #3. 1974.
 "The Service of Muses Does Not Tolerate Fuss." - Journal Yunost', #9. 1976.
 "My Comrades - Artists." - Journal Aurora, #5. 1980.
 One Fine Day...Soviet Writer, 1986.
 The Master's Violin. Ogon'ka Library, 1988.
 Alive and Only (memories of Viysotsky). Intercontact, 1990.
 Taganka. Notes of a Prisoner. Polikom, 1992.
 When I was Athos... Moscow Actor, 1999.
 Theatre of My Memory. Vagrius, 2001.
 Aphorisms. Fruit of Leisure. Kindred. Retro, 2005.
 It Doesn't Happen Like That In Life. Ta Taganka In Two Volumes. Vremya, 2008.
 Ta Taganka. Ali Baba and Others. It Doesn't Happen Like That In Life (Collection of Essays In Three Volumes). Vremya, 2010.
 Golden Age of the Taganka Theatre. Staroe Kino, 2012.
 To My Father With Love (II): Collection. Ed. A. Fin, 2012.
 I Only Explain a Stitch In Poetry...Collection of Poetry, Songs and Parodies. Put together by the Taganka Theatre, 2014.
 Notes From the Wings. Staroe Kino, 2016.
 It's Not Like That, Guys...Vladimir Viysotsky Is Remembered By His Friends and Colleagues. ACT, 2017.
 Hello, However...Memoirs About Vladimir Viysotsky. Staroe Kino, 2018.

References

External links

 
 Veniamin Smekhov Unofficial Site (Russian)

1940 births
20th-century Russian male actors
21st-century Russian male actors
Living people
Male actors from Moscow
Audiobook narrators
Recipients of the Order "For Merit to the Fatherland", 4th class
Russian activists against the 2022 Russian invasion of Ukraine
Jewish Russian actors
Russian male film actors
Russian male stage actors
Russian male television actors
Russian male voice actors
Russian television presenters
Russian theatre directors
Soviet Jews
Soviet male film actors
Soviet male stage actors
Soviet male television actors
Soviet male voice actors